The Municipality of Dobrovnik is a municipality in Slovenia. The seat of the municipality is Dobrovnik. It is located in the Prekmurje region. It has a significant Hungarian ethnic community that outnumbers the Slovenes. Dobrovnik is one of the two municipalities in Slovenia where ethnic Slovenes form a minority of the population, the other being Hodoš.

Settlements

In addition to the municipal seat of Dobrovnik, the municipality also includes the settlements of Strehovci and Žitkovci.

Demographics
Population by native language, 2002 census

References

External links
 
 Municipality of Dobrovnik on Geopedia
 Dobrovnik municipal site

Municipalities in Prekmurje